The 2021 occupation of the United States embassy compound in Yemen was the breach of the former US Embassy compound in Sanaa by Iran-backed Houthi militants on 10 November 2021.  Twenty five U.S. contractors were taken hostage; the U.S. government declined to confirm how many, but said it was "unceasing in our behind-the-scenes diplomatic efforts to secure their release."

The U.S. State Department requested that Houthi forces vacate the buildings and return all property.  Following reports of the detention of Yemeni United States Agency for International Development and other U.S. workers, a State Department spokesman declared that the U.S. “is committed to ensuring the safety of those who serve the U.S. government overseas"  Houthi militants are not a designated terrorist organization since February 2021.

See also

 2008 attack on the United States embassy in Yemen

References

Yemen
21st century in Sanaa
United States–Yemen relations
Attacks on diplomatic missions in Yemen